The 2000 African Cup of Nations was the 22nd edition of the Africa Cup of Nations, the association football championship of Africa (CAF). It was co-hosted by Ghana and Nigeria, who jointly replaced Zimbabwe as host. Just like in 1998, the field of sixteen teams was split into four groups of four.

Cameroon won the championship, beating Nigeria in the final 4–3 on penalties. As winners, they qualified for the 2001 FIFA Confederations Cup as African representatives.

Host Selection 

It was expected that Zimbabwe will host this edition but it was sidelined by the CAF on 8 February 1999 in Abidjan, Ivory Coast for non-compliance with the specifications, the CAF announced that they would be receiving applications for the new hosts until 10 March 1999.

Bids :
 Egypt
 Ghana
 Morocco
 Nigeria

Egypt, Ghana, Morocco and Nigeria, were determined by the CAF to be compliant with the host criteria. Later, Egypt withdrew.
A joint bid was formed between Ghana and Nigeria.

The organization of the 2000 Africa Cup of Nations was awarded jointly to Ghana and Nigeria on 15 March 1999 by the CAF Executive Committee meeting in Cairo, Egypt. Voters had a choice between three countries : Ghana, Morocco and Nigeria. This is the first time ever that the African Cup was co-hosted by two countries.

This is also the second time that Nigeria has hosted the African Cup after 1980 and the third time for Ghana after 1963 and 1978

Qualified teams 

 
 
 
 
 
 
  (holders)
 
  (co-hosts)
 
  (co-hosts)

Squads

Venues

First round 
Teams highlighted in green progress to the Quarter Finals.

All times local: GMT (UTC) and WAT (UTC +1)

Group A 
Group A of the 2000 AFCON remains as the only group stage that all four teams to achieve four points out of three matches.

Group B

Group C

Group D

Knockout stage

Quarterfinals

Semifinals

Third place match

Final

Scorers 
5 goals
  Shaun Bartlett

4 goals

  Samuel Eto'o
  Patrick M'Boma

3 goals

  Hossam Hassan
  Julius Aghahowa
  Jay-Jay Okocha

2 goals

  Abdelhafid Tasfaout
  Ousmane Sanou
  Marc-Vivien Foé
  Kwame Ayew
  Tijani Babangida
  Victor Ikpeba
  Henri Camara
  Siyabonga Nomvethe
  Ali Zitouni

1 goal

  Billel Dziri
  Farid Ghazi
  Fawzi Moussouni
  Ismaël Koudou
  Alassane Ouédraogo
  Raymond Kalla
  Abdel Halim Ali
  Yasser Radwan
  Hany Ramzy
  Ahmed Salah Hosny
  Bruno Mbanangoyé
  Shiva N'Zigou
  Otto Addo
  Tchiressoua Guel
  Bonaventure Kalou
  Donald-Olivier Sié
  Salaheddine Bassir
  Raphael Chukwu
  Finidi George
  Khalilou Fadiga
  Salif Keita
  Abdoulaye Mbaye
  Pape Sarr
  Dumisa Ngobe
  Lantame Ouadja
  Massamasso Tchangai
  Walid Azaiez
  Khaled Badra
  Radhi Jaïdi
  Adel Sellimi
  Kalusha Bwalya
  Laughter Chilembe
  Dennis Lota

CAF Team of the Tournament 
Goalkeeper
  Nader El-SayedDefenders  Pape Malick Diop
  Khaled Badra
  Rigobert Song
  Mohamed EmaraMidfielders  Billel Dziri
  Lauren
  Jay-Jay Okocha
  Khalilou FadigaForwards'''
  Samuel Eto'o
  Shaun Bartlett

References

External links 

 Details at RSSSF

 
Africa Cup of Nations tournaments
International association football competitions hosted by Ghana
Sport in Accra
International association football competitions hosted by Nigeria
Africa
Africa
Nat
African Cup of Nations
African Cup of Nations